VA-25 has the following meanings:
Attack Squadron 25 (U.S. Navy)
Virginia State Route 25 (disambiguation)